The Brooklyn Visitations (also known as the Triangles) were an American basketball team based in Brooklyn, New York City, that was a member of the Metropolitan Basketball League and the American Basketball League.

After the 1935/36 season the team became the Paterson Visitations. Then, during the 1st half of the 1936/37 season, the team moved back to Brooklyn on November 21, 1936, and became the Brooklyn Visitations again.

Year-by-year

Basketball teams in New York City
Sports in Brooklyn